Alex M. Dopico is an Argentinian pharmacologist and the current Distinguished Professor and Dean of the University of Tennessee Health Science Center. His current research includes ion-electrical cells' behavior on amphipathic compounds.

References

Year of birth missing (living people)
Living people
University of Tennessee faculty
American pharmacologists
University of Buenos Aires alumni